Malin Westerheim (born 10 November 1993) is a Norwegian sports shooter. She competed in the Women's 10 metre air rifle event at the 2012 Summer Olympics.

References

1993 births
Living people
Norwegian female sport shooters
Olympic shooters of Norway
Shooters at the 2010 Summer Youth Olympics
Shooters at the 2012 Summer Olympics
Shooters at the 2016 Summer Olympics
Sportspeople from Fredrikstad
European Games competitors for Norway
Shooters at the 2015 European Games
21st-century Norwegian women